The Kazakhstan Cup is the main knockout cup competition in Kazakhstan football, run by the Football Federation of Kazakhstan. The tournament was initially founded in 1936 as a competition for clubs in the Kazakh SSR but did not become a proper national competition until 1992.

Winners of Kazakh SSR Cup (1936–1991)
Note: the tournament was irregular during the Soviet period and was not contested every season. Kazakh teams in the Soviet league pyramid didn't take part in the tournament.

Finals of Kazakhstan Cup since Independence (1992–present)

Notes:
  Defunct teams.
 Historical names shown in brackets according to the season.

Performance

Performances by club

Performances by city

References

External links
RSSSF cup finals

 
1
National association football cups